Tonique Williams-Darling ( Williams; born January 17, 1976, Nassau, Bahamas) is a Bahamian sprint athlete. She won the gold medal in the 400 meters at the 2004 Summer Olympics in Athens, Greece.

College
She attended the University of South Carolina, graduating with a bachelor's degree from the Moore School of Business in 1999.

Professional

Williams-Darling had a breakout year in 2004. She started with a bronze medal at the 2004 IAAF World Indoor Championships in Budapest, Hungary, running a personal best behind Russia's Natalya Nazarova and Olesya Krasnomovets. Then in July, at the Rome meeting of the IAAF Golden League, Tonique broke Mexican world champion Ana Guevara's 23 race winning streak in the 400 meter race.

At the 2004 Summer Olympics in Athens, Greece Williams-Darling beat Guevara again. In a head-to-head final straight, she proved to be more powerful than the Mexican runner who had been hampered with injuries and trained only on a limited basis prior to the Games. Winning the race, she became the Bahamas' first individual Olympic gold medalist.

After the Olympics she secured the win in the overall Golden League-jackpot, cashing in US $500,000 after splitting the US $1M pot with Christian Olsson.

She also won the gold medal in the 400 meters at 2005 World Championships in Athletics, in a head-to-head race with American 400-meter specialist Sanya Richards. At the 2006 Commonwealth Games, despite being the favourite, she was beaten unexpectedly both in her semi-final and the final by Christine Ohuruogu of England, claiming silver instead.

Williams-Darling took the 2007 season off to nurse a hamstring injury and did not compete during the 2008 season.

In November 2012, she was elected as Public Relations Director of the Bahamas Association of Athletic Associations (BAAA) for the period 2012-2015.

In 2015 Williams-Darling served as senior director of event media services for the BTC/IAAF World Relays in the Bahamas.

Personal Life

She graduated from St. John's College, Bahamas. She is married to fellow Bahamian Track and Field athlete Dennis Darling and is the sister-in-law of former NFL wide receiver Devard Darling.

Commemorations 
In 2009 Williams-Darling was inducted into the University of South Carolina's Athletic Hall of Fame.

For her achievements to date, the Bahamas Government honoured her  by naming a major highway the Tonique Williams-Darling Highway.

References

External links
Caribbean Net News - Surprise loss at the Commonwealth Games

1976 births
Living people
Sportspeople from Nassau, Bahamas
Bahamian female sprinters
South Carolina Gamecocks women's track and field athletes
Olympic athletes of the Bahamas
Olympic gold medalists for the Bahamas
Athletes (track and field) at the 2000 Summer Olympics
Athletes (track and field) at the 2004 Summer Olympics
Athletes (track and field) at the 2006 Commonwealth Games
Athletes (track and field) at the 1999 Pan American Games
Pan American Games competitors for the Bahamas
Commonwealth Games silver medallists for the Bahamas
Commonwealth Games medallists in athletics
World Athletics Championships medalists
Medalists at the 2004 Summer Olympics
Olympic gold medalists in athletics (track and field)
IAAF Golden League winners
World Athletics Indoor Championships medalists
World Athletics Championships winners
Olympic female sprinters
Medallists at the 2006 Commonwealth Games